Don i tison (from Bafia: Town-hill) is the southernmost peak of a mountainous ridge west of the Cameroonian city of Bafia. The nearest populated place is Gouife.

In the figurative sense Don i Tison means populated peak. This comes probably from the fact that a German military base was located here from March 1911 to September 1912 during the Bafia campaign against surrounded populations. 
Some ruins from this period still remain. Most spectacular is a surrounding wall made from roughly-cut stone.

From November 6, 1914 to December 15, 1914 German ethnologist Günther Tessmann used the place as a base camp during his expedition to the Bafia people.

The ascent of the mountain is a part of the biannual Mbam'Art festival.

References

Mountains of Cameroon